Plants vs. Zombies: Battle for Neighborville is a third-person shooter developed by PopCap Games and published by Electronic Arts for PlayStation 4, Windows, Xbox One and Nintendo Switch. It is the third installment in the Plants vs. Zombies: Garden Warfare spin-off series of Plants vs. Zombies. The game was released as an early access title in September 2019 before its full release in October the same year. It received generally positive reviews upon release.

Gameplay
Similar to its predecessors, the game is a third-person shooter where players take control of the Plants or the Zombies in either a cooperative or competitive multiplayer environment. The game features 23 customizable gameplay classes, nine of which are new to the franchise. They are classified into four groups: attackers, defenders, supporters or swarm. Each team also has a new team play class that allows players of the same class to combine forms when they fight against enemies. Players can compete against each other in various competitive multiplayer modes, including the objective-based Turf Takeover mode and the team deathmatch variant Team Vanquish and many more. The game also features several player-versus-environment open zones which allow players to explore, find collectibles, and complete quests. Split-screen local multiplayer is also available for all gameplay modes.

Development
Publisher Electronic Arts confirmed the development of a new Plants vs. Zombies shooter in May 2019. An alpha testing for the game, which was codenamed "Picnic", was held in early August. The game was officially announced and released as an early access game on September 4, 2019. Players who purchased the Founder's Edition would receive regular content updates until the game's full launch on October 18, 2019, and exclusive cosmetic items every week until the game's official release.

Battle for Neighborville received its last game update on September 29, 2020.

On February 17, 2021, it was announced that the game will be released on Nintendo Switch on March 19, 2021, during the Nintendo Direct.

Reception

Plants vs. Zombies: Battle for Neighborville was given positive reviews. Destructoid gave the game on PS4 a 7.5/10 said about the game as "Battle for Neighborville doesn't go out of its way to surpass expectations, but it's a silly, strange, joyful game – one I'm glad was greenlit." GameRevolution gave the PC version 3/5 stars and said "Unfortunately, aside from its more robust [Plants vs. Zombies] offering and unique new characters, most of the other changes that have been made in Plants vs Zombies: Battle for Neighborville haven't been for the better."

On review aggregation website, Metacritic, the Xbox One version of the game has a score of 76/100, and 77/100 from both the PS4 and PC versions, indicating "generally favorable reviews".

References

External links
 

2019 video games
Early access video games
Multiplayer and single-player video games
Battle for Neighborville
PlayStation 4 games
PopCap games
Hero shooters
Third-person shooters
Tower defense video games
Video game sequels
Video games about plants
Windows games
Xbox One games
Video games about zombies
Split-screen multiplayer games
Electronic Arts games
Nintendo Switch games
Video games developed in the United States